The 2012–13 Indonesia Super League U-21 season was the fifth edition of Indonesia Super League U-21, a competition that are intended for footballers under the age of twenty-one years.

Persela U-21 is the defending champion in this season.

Format 
The competition is divided into four acts consist of two group stages and two knockout rounds, which is the semifinals and final. The first stage is divided into five groups each containing four clubs, two top teams of each group advanced to the second stage. The second stage consisted of two groups containing eight teams in each group, the two best teams from each group advanced to the semifinals. The winner advanced to the final to battle for the championship, while two teams who were defeated will play a third-placed match.

First stage 
First stage of the group stage started 27 April 2013 and ended on 16 June 2013.

Group 1
Sriwijaya FC U-21 was the host in a home tournament with home and away format.

Group 2
This group used normal home and away format.

Group 3
This group used normal home and away format.

Group 4
Barito Putera U-21 was the host for the first half of the group and Mitra Kukar FC U-21 hosted the rest of the matches.

Group 5
Persipura U-21 was the host in a home tournament with home and away format.

Updated to games played on 16 July 2013.
Source: Statistics
Rules for classification: 1st points; 2nd goal difference; 3rd number of goals scored.
(C) = Champion; (R) = Relegated; (P) = Promoted; (O) = Play-off winner; (A) = Advances to a further round.
Only applicable when the season is not finished:
(Q) = Qualified to the phase of tournament indicated; (TQ) = Qualified to tournament, but not yet to the particular phase indicated; (DQ) = Disqualified from tournament.

Second stage
The second stage started 19–25 August 2013 where each team will play other teams in their group once in a home tournament format.

Group K
All matches were played in Gelora Sriwijaya Stadium and Bumi Sriwijaya Stadium.

Group L
All matches were played in Aji Imbut Stadium and Sempaja Stadium.

Updated to games played on 25 August 2013.
Source: Statistics
Rules for classification: 1st points; 2nd goal difference; 3rd number of goals scored.
(C) = Champion; (R) = Relegated; (P) = Promoted; (O) = Play-off winner; (A) = Advances to a further round.
Only applicable when the season is not finished:
(Q) = Qualified to the phase of tournament indicated; (TQ) = Qualified to tournament, but not yet to the particular phase indicated; (DQ) = Disqualified from tournament.

Knockout stage

Semi-finals

Third-placed

Final

Season statistic

Top goalscorers

Statistics current as of 8 September 2013
Source: Statistics

See also
2013 Indonesia Super League
2013 Liga Indonesia Premier Division (LI)

References

External links
 Official Website

 
Indonesia Super League U-21 seasons
U